Bruno Saindini is a Madagascan football manager.

In September 2015, he was named as caretaker coach of the Seychelles national team. He took charge for the 2017 Africa Cup of Nations qualifying game against Ethiopia.

References 

Living people
Seychelles national football team managers
Year of birth missing (living people)
Malagasy football managers